Year 336 (CCCXXXVI) was a leap year starting on Thursday (link will display the full calendar) of the Julian calendar. At the time, it was known as the Year of the Consulship of Nepotianus and Facundus (or, less frequently, year 1089 Ab urbe condita). The denomination 336 for this year has been used since the early medieval period, when the Anno Domini calendar era became the prevalent method in Europe for naming years.

Events 
 By place 
 Roman Empire 
 The military successes of Emperor Constantine I result in most of Dacia being reconquered by the Roman Empire.
 The first recorded customs tariff is in use in Palmyra.

 By topic 
 Religion 
 January 18 – Pope Mark succeeds Pope Sylvester I as the 34th pope of the Catholic Church.
 Pope Mark begins to build the basilica of San Marco; the church is devoted to St. Mark.
 Arius, Alexandrian priest, collapses in the street in Constantinople (approximate date).
 Pope Mark dies at Rome, after an 11-month reign. No successor is immediately found.

Births 
 Chi Chao (or Jingyu), Chinese advisor and politician (d. 377)
 Murong De, Chinese emperor of the Xianbei state (d. 405)
 Richū, emperor of Japan (approximate date)

Deaths 
 October 7 – Mark, pope of the Catholic Church
 Arius, Cyrenaic presbyter and priest (b. 256)
 Gan Bao (or Kan Pao), Chinese historian 
 Murong Ren (or Qiannian), Chinese general

References